The Craxi II Cabinet was the 43rd cabinet of the Italian Republic. It held office from 1986 to 1987.

The cabinet, headed for the second time by the socialist leader Bettino Craxi, was supported by the penta-party coalition, composed of Christian Democracy (DC), Italian Socialist Party (PSI), Italian Democratic Socialist Party (PSDI), Italian Republican Party (PRI) and Italian Liberal Party (PLI).

Craxi resigned on 3 March 1987, resignations then confirmed on 9 April.

It was the first time that the Christian Democracy delegation abandoned a government to which it contributed, in a decisive way, to give life.

Party breakdown

Ministers and other members
Italian Socialist Party (PSI): prime minister, 5 ministers and 14 undersecretaries
Christian Democracy (DC): deputy prime minister, 15 ministers and 32 undersecretaries
Italian Republican Party (PRI): 3 ministers and 6 undersecretaries
Italian Democratic Socialist Party (PSDI): 3 ministers and 5 undersecretaries
Italian Liberal Party (PLI): 2 ministers and 4 undersecretaries

Composition

References

Italian governments
Cabinets established in 1986
Cabinets disestablished in 1987
1986 establishments in Italy
1987 disestablishments in Italy